Leurocephala is a genus of moths in the family Gracillariidae. It contains only one species, Leurocephala schinusae, which is found in Argentina.

The larvae feed on Schinus terebinthifolus. They mine the leaves of their host plant.

References

Moths described in 2011
Gracillariinae
Gracillarioidea genera
Monotypic moth genera
Moths of South America